Chhipi (alternatively called Chhipa/Chimpa) is  a caste of people with ancestral roots tracing back to India. They are found in the states of Gujarat, Rajasthan, Madhya Pradesh, Haryana, Delhi, Uttar Pradesh of India. Chhipa are also found in Pakistan.

History

The word chhipa is derived from the Gujarati word chhapa, which means to print. The community was originally found in Nagaur in Rajasthan.  After their settlement in Rajasthan and Gujarat, the community took up the occupation of dyeing and printing clothes. The community speak Marwari, and are found mainly in Rajasthan and in north Gujarat, in the districts of Ahmedabad, Nadiad, Baroda and Bharuch. Most Chhipa also speak Gujarati. They are converted from Cloth Printer Clan of Khatri Community.

Present circumstances

India
Each of these clans are of equal status, and intermarry. But the community not has a marked preference for cross cousin and parallel cousin marriages.

The community is still mainly involved in its traditional occupation of dyeing and printing clothes. Many in the community have taken up trade, or are employed in the local textile mills.

The community is classified as an OBC caste in the Indian states of Haryana, Delhi, Rajasthan, Madhya Pradesh, Uttar Pradesh.

Pakistan
Chhipa community is settled in Karachi, Sindh, Pakistan.

See also
 Muslim Chhipi
 Block printing

References

External links
 Chhipa block printing in Rajasthan
 Kathari block printing from 1895

Social groups of Gujarat
Tribes of Kutch
Muslim communities of Gujarat
Muslim communities of Rajasthan
Muhajir communities
Textile arts of India
Indian castes
Social groups of Rajasthan
Social groups of Madhya Pradesh
Social groups of Haryana
Social groups of Delhi
Social groups of Uttar Pradesh